The leader of the opposition in the Maharashtra Legislative Assembly is an elected member of the Maharashtra Legislative Assembly who leads the official opposition in the lower house of the Maharashtra Legislature. The leader of the opposition is the legislature speaker of the party with the most seats after the government party.

Leaders of the opposition
The Assembly's opposition parties elect a leader of the opposition. This is commonly the leader of the largest non-government party, and is recognized as such by the speaker. The following is the list of leaders of the opposition in the assembly.

Deputy Leaders of the Opposition

Jayant Patil (NCP)
23 December 2014 – 20 April 2018
Shashikant Shinde (NCP)
20 April 2018 – 09 November 2019

Sudhir Mungantiwar (BJP)
(02 December 2019 - 29 June 2022)
Balasaheb Thorat (INC)
(04 July 2022 - Incumbent)

See also
List of governors of Maharashtra
List of chief ministers of Maharashtra
List of deputy chief ministers of Maharashtra
List of Chairman of the Maharashtra Legislative Council
List of speakers of the Maharashtra Legislative Assembly
List of Deputy Speakers of the Maharashtra Legislative Assembly

List of Leader of the House of the Maharashtra Legislative Assembly
List of Leaders of the House of the Maharashtra Legislative Council
List of Leader of the Opposition of the Maharashtra Legislative Council

References

 
Maharashtra Legislative Assembly
Maharashtra Legislative Assembly, Leader of the Opposition